Surfing at the 2011 Pacific Games in Nouméa, New Caledonia was held on August 31–September 2, 2011.

Medal summary

Medal table

Results

References

Surfing at the 2011 Pacific Games

2011 Pacific Games
Pacific Games
2011
Surfing in New Caledonia